Bangzi (梆子), also known as Bangzi opera and Clapper opera, may refer to several closely related Chinese opera genres:

Henan opera, from Henan
Hebei bangzi, from Hebei
Qinqiang, from Shaanxi
Shanxi opera, from Shanxi

See also
Four Great Characteristic Melodies